María Ladvenant (1741–1767) was a Spanish stage actress. Her short and successful but tumultuous career and her early death made her the subject of legend and she was celebrated by authors such as José Cadalso, Leandro Fernández de Moratín and Jovellanos.

References
 Cotarelo y Mori, Emilio (2007). María Ladvenant y Quirante. Primera dama de los teatros de la Corte. Madrid, Asociación de Directores de Escena de España. pp. 49 - 130. .

1741 births
1767 deaths
18th-century Spanish actresses
Spanish stage actresses